Ariane Labed (born 8 May 1984) is a Greek-French actress and film director. She is known for her feature film debut in Attenberg, for which she won the Volpi Cup for Best Actress, and appearing in Helen Edmundson's film Mary Magdalene in 2018.

Early life
Born to French parents, Labed spent her first six years in Athens, Greece, then moved to Germany. She moved to France when she was 12 years old. Labed studied theater at the University of Provence (DEUST basic training in theater, Bachelor of Performing Arts and master's degree in dramaturgy and scenic writing). She participated in the creation of the Vasistas theater troupe with Argyro Chioti and went on stage with the National Theater of Greece.

Career
Labed was awarded the Volpi Cup for Best Actress at the 67th Venice International Film Festival for her performance in Attenberg, directed by Athina Rachel Tsangari, which was her debut film. She starred in the films Alps and The Lobster directed by Yorgos Lanthimos. In 2018, she appeared as Rachel in Helen Edmundson's film Mary Magdalene.

Personal life
She has been married to Greek filmmaker Yorgos Lanthimos since 2013.

Filmography

Film

Television

Awards and nominations

References

External links

1984 births
Living people
21st-century French actresses
Actresses from Athens
French film actresses
French women film directors
Greek people of French descent
University of Provence alumni
Volpi Cup for Best Actress winners